Woodlawn Park is a  public park in northeast Portland, Oregon. Operated by Portland Parks & Recreation, the park was acquired in 1975.

References

External links

 

1975 establishments in Oregon
Northeast Portland, Oregon
Parks in Portland, Oregon